Orville F. Berry (February 19, 1852 – December 13, 1921) was an American businessman and politician.

Berry was born in McDonough County, Illinois. He went to the public schools and lived in Carthage, Illinois with his wife and family. Berry was admitted to the Illinois bar in 1877. He was the owner of the Mississippi Valley Telephone Company. Berry also serve as chairman of the Illinois Railroad and Warehouse Commission. Berry serve in the Illinois Senate from 1889 to 1909. Berry was a Republican. Berry died at a hospital in Jacksonville, Illinois from heart problems.

Notes

External links

1852 births
1921 deaths
People from Carthage, Illinois
People from McDonough County, Illinois
Businesspeople from Illinois
Illinois lawyers
Republican Party Illinois state senators
19th-century American lawyers